Viking Global Investors is an American-based hedge fund based in Greenwich, Connecticut, which specialises in early stage and late stage ventures.

History 
It was established in October 1999 by its CEO and risk manager, Ole Andreas Halvorsen, Brian T Olson and David C Ott.

Ole Andreas Halvorsen previously worked for Julian Robertson at the firm Tiger Management, making Viking one of the 30 or more so-called "Tiger Cubs," funds founded by managers who started their investment careers with Tiger Management.

In June 2017, Viking announced that it was returning $8 billion to investors to "reset to a smaller size."

Viking has offices in Greenwich, where it is headquartered, New York, Hong Kong, London and San Francisco.

References

Tiger Management
Investment management companies of the United States
1999 establishments in Connecticut
Hedge fund firms in Connecticut
Companies based in Greenwich, Connecticut
Hedge funds
Privately held companies based in Connecticut
Financial services companies established in 1999